Seamus Martin McDonagh (born 6 October 1952), known as Jim McDonagh, is a former professional footballer who played as a goalkeeper. He made more than 400 appearances in the English leagues. Born in England, he won 25 caps for Ireland. He then became a goalkeeping coach, working with numerous clubs in the English game until joining Martin O'Neill's coaching team at Sunderland in 2011. In November 2013 he was appointed to the same role with the Republic of Ireland national team by O'Neill, and in 2019 he followed O'Neill to Nottingham Forest as head goalkeeping coach

Playing career
McDonagh started his career at his hometown club Rotherham United, and spent a month on loan at Manchester United in 1973, before joining Bolton Wanderers, initially on loan, taking over from the recently departed Barry Siddall. An ever-present during the Second Division Championship-winning side of 1977–78, he set a club record of conceding only 33 goals in a 42-match season. For the following two seasons in the top flight he was also an ever-present and did well enough for Everton to sign him for £250,000 when Bolton were relegated in 1979–80. Within a year Neville Southall had come through the ranks at Everton and McDonagh found himself back at Bolton. Another demotion followed in 1982–83, even with McDonagh managing to score a goal, and he moved on to Notts County for two seasons before wandering around a further six English clubs as well as teams in the USA. It was while he was at Bolton that he received the first of 25 caps for Ireland.

Coaching career
He was appointed player/manager of Galway United in 1988 when they were in the relegation zone. Despite helping save the club from relegation his contract was unilaterally terminated by United in May 1989.

McDonagh went on to have coaching positions at clubs including Coventry City, Mansfield Town, Nottingham Forest, Millwall, Rotherham United, Leicester City, Aston Villa, Plymouth Argyle and Hull City. He was appointed Sunderland's first-team goalkeeping coach by Martin O'Neill on 6 December 2011. O'Neill then appointed him to the same role with the Republic of Ireland national team in November 2013. On 21 November 2018, O'Neill and his backroom staff parted company with the FAI, and in January 2019, McDonagh followed O'Neill to Nottingham Forest as head goalkeeping coach.

See also
 List of Republic of Ireland international footballers born outside the Republic of Ireland

References
General

Specific

External links
Profile on F.A.I. website

1952 births
Living people
Footballers from Rotherham
English footballers
Association football goalkeepers
Republic of Ireland association footballers
Republic of Ireland expatriate association footballers
Republic of Ireland international footballers
Rotherham United F.C. players
Manchester United F.C. players
Bolton Wanderers F.C. players
Everton F.C. players
Notts County F.C. players
Birmingham City F.C. players
Gillingham F.C. players
Sunderland A.F.C. players
Expatriate soccer players in the United States
Irish expatriate sportspeople in the United States
Major Indoor Soccer League (1978–1992) players
Wichita Wings (MISL) players
Scarborough F.C. players
Huddersfield Town A.F.C. players
Charlton Athletic F.C. players
Galway United F.C. (1937–2011) players
Spalding United F.C. players
Grantham Town F.C. players
Telford United F.C. players
Arnold Town F.C. players
English Football League players
League of Ireland players
Galway United F.C. managers
League of Ireland managers
Mansfield Town F.C. non-playing staff
Coventry City F.C. non-playing staff
Nottingham Forest F.C. non-playing staff
Plymouth Argyle F.C. non-playing staff
Hull City A.F.C. non-playing staff
Leicester City F.C. non-playing staff
Aston Villa F.C. non-playing staff
Sunderland A.F.C. non-playing staff
English people of Irish descent
English football managers
Association football goalkeeping coaches